Fort Ancient is a name for a Native American culture that flourished from Ca. 1000-1750 CE and predominantly inhabited land near the Ohio River valley in the areas of modern-day southern Ohio, northern Kentucky, southeastern Indiana and western West Virginia. Although a contemporary of the Mississippian culture, they are often considered a "sister culture" and distinguished from the Mississippian culture.  Although far from agreed upon, there is evidence to suggest that the Fort Ancient Culture were not the direct descendants of the Hopewellian Culture. It is suspected that the Fort Ancient Culture introduced maize agriculture to Ohio. The Fort Ancient Culture were most likely the builders of the Great Serpent Mound. Recent archeological study and carbon dating suggests that Alligator Mound in Granville also dates to the Fort Ancient era, rather than the assumed Hopewell era. It is believed that neither the Serpent or Alligator Mounds are burial locations, but rather served as ceremonial effigy sites.

Name
The name of the culture originates from the Fort Ancient, Ohio archeological site. However, the Fort Ancient Site is now thought to have been built by Ohio Hopewellian people. It was likely occupied later by the succeeding Fort Ancient culture. The site is located on a hill above the Little Miami River, close to Lebanon, Ohio. Despite its name, most archaeologists do not believe that Fort Ancient was used primarily as a fortress by either the Ohio Hopewell culture or the Fort Ancient culture; it was more likely to have been a ceremonial location.

Archaeological record

Chronology

Starting in about 1000 CE, terminal Late Woodland groups in the Middle Ohio Valley adopted maize agriculture.  They began settling in small, year-round nuclear family households and settlements of no more than 40 to 50 individuals. These small scattered settlements, located along terraces that overlooked rivers and sometimes on flood plains, would be occupied for short periods before the groups moved on to new locations.

By 1200, the small villages began to coalesce into larger settlements of up to 300 people.  They were occupied for longer periods, possibly up to 25 years. During the Early and Middle Fort Ancient period, the houses were designed as single-family dwellings. Later Fort Ancient buildings are larger multi-family dwellings. Settlements were rarely permanent, as the people commonly moved to a new location after one or two generations, when the natural resources surrounding the old village were exhausted. The people laid out the villages around an open oval central plaza, surrounded by circular and/or rectangular domestic structures facing the plaza. The arrangement of buildings in Fort Ancient settlements is thought to have served as a sort of solar calendar, marking the positions of the solstices and other significant dates. the people began to build low platform mounds for ceremonial purposes, and many villages added defensive palisades to their boundaries. The plaza was the center of village life: the place where ceremonies, games (such as chunkey) and other social events were held.

The Late Fort Ancient period from 1400 to 1750 is the protohistoric era in the Middle Ohio Valley. During this era, the formerly dispersed populations began to coalesce.  The Gist-phase villages (1400 to 1550 CE) became much larger than during the preceding period, with populations as high as 500. Archaeologists have speculated that the larger villages and palisades are evidence that after 1450, warfare and intergroup strife increased, leading the people to consolidate their villages for better protection.

This era also showed increased contact with Mississippian peoples; some of whom may have migrated to and been integrated into Fort Ancient villages. The Madisonville horizon of artifacts after 1400 includes relatively high proportions of bowls, salt pans, triangular strap handles, colanders, negative painted pottery, notched and beaded rims, and some effigies, all items and styles that are usually associated with the Mississippian cultures of the Lower Ohio Valley, at sites such as Angel Mounds and Kincaid Mounds.  These sites were abandoned during this time period.

During the Montour phase (1550 to 1700), the people inhabited their villages year-round, although less densely in the winter than in the summer months. This may indicate that during the winter, family groups and hunting parties may have returned to the regions previously occupied by their ancestors. Such a pattern was observed during historic times, for example, among the Miami and Potawatomi. By their trading, the Fort Ancient people had access to European trade items, such as glass, iron, brass, and copper, which have been found as grave goods at sites such as Lower Shawneetown and Hardin Village.  Such artifacts appeared and were used in the area before the arrival of European explorers or settlers.

Although the Fort Ancient peoples did not encounter Europeans at this time, they, like other groups in the interior of the continent, may have suffered high fatalities from their diseases, transmitted among Native Americans by trade contacts. The next-known inhabitants of the area, who were encountered by French and English explorers, were the historic Shawnee tribe. Scholars believe that the Fort Ancient society, like the Mississippian cultures to the south and west, may have been severely disrupted by waves of infectious disease epidemics from the first Spanish explorers in the mid-16th century.

After 1525, at the Madisonville site, the type site for the Madisonville phase, dwellings were built on a smaller scale and in fewer number. This change indicated the culture was less attached to agriculture and a sedentary life.  Scholars generally believe that similarities in material culture, art, mythology, and Shawnee oral history link the historic tribe to the Fort Ancient people. However, there is also evidence that the Algonquian Shawnee culture may have been more of an admixture or intrusion to the site, which may have previously been Siouan occupied.

Evolution of society
The Fort Ancient culture can be divided largely into early, middle, and late phases. It is not believed that they merged into a singular society until close to the end of the middle phase.

Early phase (approx. 1000-1250 CE)
During this period, the Fort Ancients were several poor sedentary societies. They lived in un-palisaded villages & had slight regional variances. The locals farmed primarily corn, beans & sunflower—the last of which being a plant first domesticated as a food source in Ohio. Most homes were of a type called a pit-house. This was a dig-in several feet into the ground, which was covered over with a bark-plaster-over-wood-frame roof. Carbon dating has shown that Fort Ancient lands in West Virginia did not begin to be conquered by them until the middle phase.

Middle phase (approx. 1250-1450 CE)

At this time, the cultures became far richer, began to expand & began to merge into a single, continuous culture. Villages grew larger, became palisaded & pit-houses began to be phased out in favor of the style of native dwelling colonial peoples would refer to as a Cabin-style. This was a rectangular, peak roofed home of either an adobe-like or wooden make and covered over by the same style of roof as the pit house.

It is important to note what other things were happening at the same time. Between 1100 and 1300 CE, the far richer & larger Mississippian culture began shifting its centers away from the Mississippi River and into the American Southeast. Also, Iroquoian expansions to the northeast of the Fort Ancients brought new Algonquian & Iroquoian neighbors into their region. We also see the Fort Ancients begin to borrow heavily from almost every culture with whom they interacted. Eastern Fort Ancients were amalgamating a mound burial with Iroquoian techniques of defleshing the dead & urn burials. Mississippian influence came up from the south. In western Ohio, there is even heavy evidence that they took on the Algonquian Green Corn Ceremony, in which part of the unripened corn crop was "sacrificed" by burning and its ashes were used to re-fertilize the fields. Around 1300, however, it appears that Mound burials were replaced entirely by the Eastern Siouan tradition of under-the-home burials (This custom also entered Monongahela society).

Late phase (approx. 1450-1750 CE)
Here, Fort Ancient culture was at its height. Only one known Fort Ancient tribe has been verified by name in the historical record—the Mosopelea, presumably of southeast Ohio. There is also a chance that a Siouan people called the Keyauwee, who appear alongside the Tutelo (an Eastern Siouan tribe from West Virginia) in North Carolina around 1700 could also have been of Fort Ancient stock. During the French explorations, a Ho-chunk native named Tonti told them that these people had been known as the Chonque. Mosopelea language is marked as being the only known Siouan tongue to use the "f" sound, which is far more common among the Muskogean languages of the Mississippians.

Despite no historical accounts of contact existing, we see a remarkable amount of European made goods from Fort Ancient sites—including brass and steel items, as well as glassware. They even melted down old or broken goods and reforged them into new items. No single gun part has yet been discovered in conjunction with a Fort Ancient site. The Fort Ancients were heavily affected by European disease, as well as the Beaver Wars period. Carbon dating seems to dictate that they were wiped out, not altogether, but in waves. The most recent of all surviving sites date from Northern Kentucky alone—these being any from 1680 and on. There have been no real French accounts brought forward detailing contact, as they arrived in the region at that time, however the French did note that most of both sides of the Ohio River Valley was covered in similar styled villages in various states of destruction or abandonment.

Four foci
Fort Ancient culture is divided into four distinct local variations known as foci (plural of focus). They are the Madisonville focus, the Baum focus, the Feurt focus, and the Anderson focus.  Fort Ancient culture can be subdivided into at least 8 phases that fall into different time periods and different areas of southern Ohio and adjacent states.  There was increasing similarity between Fort Ancient phases leading up to 1650 CE, characterized by the native artifacts and European trade goods found at the Madisonville site.

Social hierarchy

The differences in ceramics show they were a culture distinct from that of the Middle Mississippian peoples. Fort Ancient settlements lacked Mississippian traits such as political centralization and elite social structures.

Although individuals might have risen to the status of leader, the Fort Ancient culture appears to have been egalitarian. For example, grave goods rarely vary between individuals, which shows that social levels were weakly defined. Scholars believe that their societies were organized into groups (maybe tribes) based on kinship. If social organization was based on kinship, people likely achieved some status by personal qualities, such as sharing/giving, being a good hunter or food provider, charisma, etc.  Individuals might achieve high status by deeds. Such high-status people were probably leaders of communities and were potentially responsible for organizing trade, for settling disputes among other members of the village, and for presiding over ceremonies. Evidence indicates that Fort Ancient leadership was more like that of the historic Iroquois, where the obligations of generosity left leaders to be buried with no more than others of their age.

Ceramics
Fort Ancient peoples used a technique known as coiling to make their pottery.  No Native American groups developed the potters wheel. Women were generally the pottery specialists.  They rolled the clay into long, rounded strips, which they used to model the vessel, layering the strips one on top of another. The inside of the vessel was then smoothed out using a potters anvil (a smooth round stone) and the outside was smoothed using a wooden paddle. Cord-marking and engraving were used to decorate the pot in styles characteristic of particular time periods and peoples.

During this period, pottery was distinguished by thinner walls than preceding Woodland pottery. Common shapes are large plain cooking jars with strap or loop handles. A hallmark of Fort Ancient pottery is engraved decorations on the rim and neck of the vessels, consisting of a series of interlocking lines, called guilloché. As this design emerged with the beginning of the Fort Ancient culture in the region, scholars use it as a characteristic to identify the culture.

Mississippian influences
During the Early Fort Ancient period, grit (crushed stone) and grog (crushed pottery) were more often used as tempering agents, with ground mussel shells occasionally being used. With the passage of time, women increasingly chose mussel shells or a mixture of mussel shell with other agents as the tempering agent. The use of ground shells as a temper is a feature often associated with Mississippian cultures. This new technology was adopted in different Fort Ancient areas at different times.  Its acceptance became more prevalent in villages, moving north and east from the Ohio River and the direction of the closest Mississippian groups in the southwest.

With the change of temper, different vessel forms and decorations became more prevalent; several of them are also strongly associated with Mississippian cultures. Early Fort Ancient vessels were often jug forms with lug handles. By the Middle Fort Ancient period, bowls and plates were being produced more frequently, and artisans added strap handles. Negative painting (a decoration often associated with the Angel phase sites in the Lower Ohio Valley) and Ramey Incised designs (elite motifs associated with the Cahokia polity in Illinois) have been found on some pots.  Others show a blending of different styles, for instance, with the engraved guilloché decoration overlain by negative painting. Archeological excavations have found examples of non-local pottery from this period as well.  Made from non-local clay sources, the pieces have designs or vessel forms atypical for local wares. At the Madisonville site was found a head pot similar to those produced in the Central Mississippi Valley by the peoples of the Middle Mississippian Parkin and Nodena phases. Archaeologists suggest that the change in pottery styles was a result of increased contact with the Mississippian cultures to the south and west of the Fort Ancient peoples.

Tools

The Fort Ancient peoples made tools from a variety of materials, including stone, bone, horn, shells and antlers; stone tools have been found more frequently than those of other materials. The culture is known by its distinctive small triangular flint arrowheads and large triangular flint knives. They made hoes for farming from mussel shells.  They ground and polished stones into the proper shape for axes to use in felling trees. Most of the flint tools were made from varieties of locally available materials, showing the Fort Ancient peoples either felt no need for or did not have access to exotic stone varieties through trade routes.

Diet
The Fort Ancient were primarily a farming and hunting people. Their diet was composed mainly of the New World staples known as the three sisters (maize, squash, and beans), supplemented by hunting and fishing in nearby forests and rivers. Important game species included the black bear, turkey, white tail deer and elk. Archaeologists have found evidence at some sites that suggest turkeys were kept in pens. The average lifespan during this time period decreased from that of their ancestors. The people were smaller in stature and less able to fend off infectious diseases than previous peoples.  Archaeological investigations of their cemeteries has shown that almost all Fort Ancients peoples showed pathology of some kind, with high incidence of dental disease and arthritis.

Sites

Contemporaries and neighbors
The people of the Fort Ancient regions were surrounded by other groups, some similar in their lifestyles and some not. To their northeast in present-day Western Pennsylvania, Eastern Ohio and West Virginia were the peoples of the Monongahela culture, who inhabited the Monongahela River Valley from 1050 to 1635. They had a similar lifestyle to the Fort Ancients; they were also maize agriculturalists and lived in well laid out palisaded villages with central oval plazas, some of which consisted of as many as 50-100 structures. To the northwest of the Fort Ancients were the people of the Oliver phase who lived along the east and west forks of the White River in central and southern Indiana from 1200 and 1450. Their villages were also circular with palisades. Although their sites began in central Indiana, over the years they spread to the southeast toward the Fort Ancients. The Oliver phase people were part of the Western Basin Tradition which also includes the Springwells phase, the Younge phase, and the Riviere au Vase phases of Northern Ohio and Indiana. The colder weather of the Little Ice Age may have caused inter-group battling over food and other resources, according to some scholars. The crops did not prosper as well during this colder period, causing food shortages for populations that had grown after their introduction. Some studies show that the culture began failing due to poor health conditions.

These groups, along with others such as the Oneota, were once classified as Upper Mississippian cultures under the assumption that they were either Mississippian peoples intruding into these areas or they were heavily influenced by the Mississippian peoples to their south and east. Today it is thought that these groups were local in situ developments of Late Woodland peoples.

Located  down the Ohio River to the southwest of the westernmost Fort Ancient settlements were the Middle Mississippian culture peoples of the Prather Complex. This stretch of river was an empty buffer zone, possibly for social or political reasons, although it may also been because the narrowing of the alluvial valley between the Falls of the Ohio region near Louisville, Kentucky and the mouth of the Miami River at Cincinnati, Ohio made it less suitable for the intensive maize agriculture practiced by both societies.

Possible symbolism
Many artifacts have been found associated with the Fort Ancients—some of the most common being four-handled funerary urns, salamanders and snakes. Possible symbolism of the urn may be a connection to common Siouan religious beliefs. At least one artifact containing the Siouan religious symbol known as the medicine wheel (a cross inside of a circle) has been found. This stands, primarily, for the fact that all life sprung from the same place and returns to that source in the end. The four-handled urns may be to evoke that symbol, more so than having any real, practical use.

Two possibilities of the Salamander motif can also be explored. In Plains Indian culture that Salamanders represented boys and turtles represented girls. Mothers would have a special medicine pouch made for one or the other to represent their children and containing the umbilical cord, which they would wear so long as both still lived. The other possibility comes from the Eastern Siouans, who express a belief that "when a Salamander barks, someone will soon die." So, perhaps, the Salamander was a sort of death omen to the Fort Ancients, or had something to do with the door between the living and dead worlds.

The Serpent Burial Mound is another example of symbolism. This creation is made specifically to mirror a known constellation to many Siouan peoples, known as the Snake. It is depicted as swallowing an egg whole, representing the struggle against overwhelming odds for the sake of the people. Furthermore, some Siouan peoples seem to have believed that the stars seen at night were a mirror of the spirit world itself, each one representing an ancestor at peace. Therefore, you can see that this mound may have been a special place to bury those with special honors, anchors such people to the earth and their descendants and mimicking the same constellation and would have had great meaning.

References

Bibliography 
 Koch, Felix J. (1882-1933): A Visit to Fort Ancient, Ohio Archæological and Historical Society Publications: Volume 20 [1911], pp. 248–252.

External links

Official Fort Ancient Website
Fort Ancient, Ancient Ohio Trail
Earthworks Timeline, Ancient Ohio Trail
Hopewell Ceremonial Earthworks UNESCO World Heritage Nomination
Ohio History Teachers' page on Fort Ancient
Fort Ancient Culture
SunWatch - a restored Fort Ancient village
Fort Ancient Culture , Virtual First Ohioans
 
 

Post-Archaic period in North America
 
Archaeological cultures of North America
Native American history of Indiana
Native American history of Kentucky
Native American history of West Virginia
Formative period in the Americas
11th-century establishments in North America
1750s disestablishments in the Thirteen Colonies
Archaeology of the United States
Pre-Columbian cultures
Prehistoric cultures in Ohio